The 40th Australian Film Institute Awards (generally known as the AFI Awards) were held on 7 November 1998 at the Sydney Convention and Exhibition Centre. Presented by the Australian Film Institute (AFI), the awards celebrated the best in Australian feature film, documentary, short film and television productions of 1998. The Boys received the most nominations in the feature film category with thirteen, while Wildside received six nominations in the television category.

Winners and nominees
Winners are listed first and highlighted in boldface.

Feature film

Non-feature film

Television

Additional awards

References

External links
 Official AACTA website

AACTA Awards ceremonies
AACTA Awards
AACTA Awards
AACTA Awards
AACTA Awards